Communauté d'agglomération Bergeracoise is the communauté d'agglomération, an intercommunal structure, centred on the town of Bergerac. It is located in the Dordogne department, in the Nouvelle-Aquitaine region, southwestern France. Created in 2017, its seat is in Bergerac. Its area is 586.6 km2. Its population was 60,585 in 2019, of which 26,693 in Bergerac proper.

Composition
The communauté d'agglomération consists of the following 38 communes:

Bergerac
Bosset
Bouniagues
Colombier
Cours-de-Pile
Creysse
Cunèges
Le Fleix
La Force
Fraisse
Gageac-et-Rouillac
Gardonne
Ginestet
Lamonzie-Montastruc
Lamonzie-Saint-Martin
Lembras
Lunas
Mescoules
Monbazillac
Monestier
Monfaucon
Mouleydier
Pomport
Prigonrieux
Queyssac
Razac-de-Saussignac
Ribagnac
Rouffignac-de-Sigoulès
Saint-Georges-Blancaneix
Saint-Germain-et-Mons
Saint-Géry
Saint-Laurent-des-Vignes
Saint-Nexans
Saint-Pierre-d'Eyraud
Saint-Sauveur
Saussignac
Sigoulès-et-Flaugeac
Thénac

References

Bergerac
Bergerac